This is a list of Japanese football J1 League transfers in the winter transfer window 2016–17 by club.

Urawa Red Diamonds 

In:

Out:

Kawasaki Frontale 

In:

Out:

Kashima Antlers 

In:

Out:

Gamba Osaka

In:

Out:

Omiya Ardija

In:

Out:

Sanfrecce Hiroshima

In:

Out:

Vissel Kobe

In:

Out:

Kashiwa Reysol

In:

Out:

Yokohama F. Marinos

In:

Out:

FC Tokyo

In:

Out:

Sagan Tosu

In:

Out:

Vegalta Sendai

In:

Out:

Júbilo Iwata

In:

Out:

Ventforet Kofu

In:

Out:

Albirex Niigata

In:

Out:

Hokkaido Consadole Sapporo

In:

Out:

Shimizu S-Pulse

In:

Out:

Cerezo Osaka

In:

Out:

References 

2016–17
Transfers
Japan